Wes Cunningham (born March 9, 1987) is a Canadian professional ice hockey player. He is currently playing with the MAC Budapest in the Erste Liga.

Playing career
Undrafted and following a season of play in Norway, Cunningham returned to North America to play the 2013–14 season in the ECHL with the Bakersfield Condors.

On July 1, 2014, Cunningham was signed by Dragons de Rouen to play the 2014–15 season in the French Ligue Magnus.

On August 19, 2015, Cunningham again returned to America as a free agent, signing a one-year ECHL contract with the Missouri Mavericks.

Awards and honours
All-ECHL First Team (2010–11)

References

External links

1987 births
Living people
Bakersfield Condors (1998–2015) players
Belleville Bulls players
Bridgeport Sound Tigers players
Canadian ice hockey defencemen
Dragons de Rouen players
Elmira Jackals (ECHL) players
Greenville Road Warriors players
Lørenskog IK players
MAC Budapest players
Missouri Mavericks players
Norfolk Admirals players
Norfolk Admirals (ECHL) players
Owen Sound Attack players
Plymouth Whalers players
Tulsa Oilers (1992–present) players
Canadian expatriate ice hockey players in France
Canadian expatriate ice hockey players in Hungary
Canadian expatriate ice hockey players in Norway
Canadian expatriate ice hockey players in the United States